A French auction (Offre à Prix Minimal, formerly Mise en Vente) is a multiple-price auction used for pricing initial public offerings.

In this offering, the firm announces a minimum (reserve) price. Investors place sealed bids for quantity and price. When the bids are in, the firm negotiates a minimum and maximum price with the market regulator (the Société des Bourses Françaises, or SBF).

Any bid above the maximum price is eliminated as a virtual market order. The bidders who bid between the minimum and maximum price are awarded shares on a pro rata basis, each paying the minimum price.

If demand for the stock is too high, then the IPO may be changed to fixed-price offering.

See also
 Book building

References
 
 

Types of auction
Corporate finance
Stock market
Economy of France